Local elections were held in the Socialist Republic of Romania on 9 March 1980.

A mandate represented two and a half years, according to 1965 Constitution of Romania.

References 

Local election, 1980
Local election, 1980
Romania
March 1980 events in Europe